Atractaspis branchi, known commonly as Branch's stiletto snake, is a species of fossorial, venomous snake in the family Atractaspididae. The species is endemic to West Africa.

Etymology
The specific name branchi is to honor South African herpetologist William Roy (Bill) Branch, a world-leading expert on African reptiles.

Description
The species A. branchi, like other species of its genus, is notable for its unusual skull, allowing it to stab sideways with a fang sticking out of the corner of its mouth. A. branchi has morphological similarities to A. reticulata, but is distinguished by having 19 rows of dorsal scales at midbody.

Habitat and geographic range
Atractaspis branchi lives in primary rainforest and rainforest edges in the western part of the Upper Guinea forests in Guinea and Liberia.

References

Atractaspididae
Snakes of Africa
Reptiles described in 2019